The Canton of Courçon is a former canton of the Charente-Maritime département, in France. It was disbanded following the French canton reorganisation which came into effect in March 2015. It consisted of 14 communes, which joined the canton of Marans in 2015. It had 14,928 inhabitants (2012). The lowest point was the river Sèvre Niortaise (2 m), the highest point was in Benon at 56 m, the average elevation was 12 m. The most populated commune was Saint-Jean-de-Liversay with 2,570 inhabitants (2012).

Communes of Courçon

The canton comprised the following communes:

Angliers
Benon
Courçon
Cramchaban
Ferrières
La Grève-sur-Mignon
Le Gué-d'Alleré
La Laigne
Nuaillé-d'Aunis
La Ronde
Saint-Cyr-du-Doret
Saint-Jean-de-Liversay
Saint-Sauveur-d'Aunis
Taugon

Population history

See also 
 Cantons of the Charente-Maritime department

References

Former cantons of Charente-Maritime
2015 disestablishments in France
States and territories disestablished in 2015